is a train station in Gose, Nara, Japan.

Lines
  JR-West
  Wakayama Line

Platforms and tracks

External links
 Official website 

Railway stations in Japan opened in 1896
Railway stations in Nara Prefecture